William Pickett (1805 – 7 December 1849) was an English cricketer.  Pickett's batting style is unknown.  He was born at Streatham, Surrey.

Pickett made his first-class debut for Sussex against Kent in 1828.  He made sixteen further first-class appearances for Sussex, the last of which came against England in 1838.  In his total of seventeen first-class matches, Pickett was not noted for his success with the bat, scoring just 132 runs at an average of 4.62, with a high score of 31.

He died at Brighton, Sussex on 7 December 1849.

References

External links
William Pickett at ESPNcricinfo
William Pickett at CricketArchive

1805 births
1849 deaths
People from Streatham
English cricketers
Sussex cricketers